Magdusa Ka (International title: Misery / ) is a 2008 Philippine television drama series broadcast by GMA Network. Based on a 1986 Philippine film of the same title, the series is the eighth instalment of Sine Novela. Directed by Maryo J. de los Reyes, it stars Katrina Halili, Dennis Trillo and Iwa Moto. It premiered on May 12, 2008 on the network's Dramarama sa Hapon line up replacing Maging Akin Ka Lamang. The series concluded on August 29, 2008 with a total of 80 episodes. It was replaced by Una Kang Naging Akin in its timeslot.

Cast and characters

Lead cast
 Katrina Halili as Christine Salvador Doliente-Henson
 Dennis Trillo as Rodolfo "Rod" Henson
 Iwa Moto as Millet Calpito

Supporting cast
 Rita Avila as Victoria "Toyang" Salvador
 Gardo Versoza as Bernardo Doliente
 Liza Lorena as Perla Doliente
 Jackie Lou Blanco as Olivia Doliente
 Ana Capri as Hedy
 Emilio Garcia as Gerry Henson
 Gabby Eigenmann as Roland Henson
 Rich Asuncion as Violy
 Prince Stefan as Sonny
 Luz Valdez as Aling Bebang

Guest cast
 Deborah Sun as Amanda
 Anton Bernardo as Victor
 Karla Estrada as Metring
 Blue Mark Roces as James
 Shirley Dalton as Lani

Ratings
According to AGB Nielsen Philippines' Mega Manila household television ratings, the pilot episode of Magdusa Ka earned a 24.3% rating. While the final episode scored a 24% rating.

Accolades

References

External links
 

2008 Philippine television series debuts
2008 Philippine television series endings
Filipino-language television shows
GMA Network drama series
Live action television shows based on films
Television shows set in the Philippines